Amblyptilia epotis is a moth of the family Pterophoridae. It is endemic to New Zealand and is found in the South and Stewart Islands. It inhabits mountainous terrain covered in alpine vegetation or alternatively alpine wetland habitat. The adults of this species are on the wing from February to March. In appearance the adults of this species are variable in colour however this species can be distinguished from similar species by the oblique apical streak on its forewings as well as the patch of white on the costa cilia towards the apex of the forewing.

Taxonomy 
This species was first described by Edward Meyrick in 1905 and named Platyptilia epotis using a female specimen collected at the Humboldt Range by George Hudson. In 1910 Meyrick again discussed this species as Hudson sent further specimens to him including the male of the species. In 1928 Hudson, in his publication, The butterflies and moths of New Zealand, placed this species in the genus Stenoptilia. However Alfred Philpott, also in 1928, considered this species under its originally published name Platyptilia epotis. Philpott discussed the male genitalia of this species with the aim of separating species contained in the genera Platyptilia and Stenoptilia. In 1971 Dugdale also discussed the species under the name Platyptilia epotis but in 1988 dealt with this species under the name Stenoptilia epotis. In 1993 Cees Gielis placed this species within the genus Amblyptilia. This placement was followed in 2010 in the New Zealand Inventory of Biodiversity. The holotype specimen is held at the Natural History Museum, London.

Description 

Meyrick originally described this species as follows:
This species is variable in colour with specimens from the Mount Arthur tableland being more ochreous and less white than the type specimen. Hudson states that the species can be distinguished from similar species by the oblique apical streak on its forewings as well as a patch of white on the costa cilia towards the apex of the forewing.

Distribution 
This species is endemic to New Zealand. It is found in the South Island and on Stewart Island / Rakiura.

Behaviour 
Adults of A. epotis are on the wing from February to March.

Habitat 
This species inhabits mountainous terrain with alpine vegetation or alpine wetland habitat.

References

Moths described in 1905
Amblyptilia
Endemic fauna of New Zealand
Moths of New Zealand
Taxa named by Edward Meyrick
Endemic moths of New Zealand